Happy Channel is a television channel, which is based in Bucharest, Romania. Launched on 15 January 2006, it is a part of the Intact group, formerly owned by the businessman and politician Dan Voiculescu.

The television channel is dedicated to women and their families, being in direct competition with the Acasă TV channel.

Original series

Celebrities 
 Carmen Tănase
 Anca Țurcașiu
 Cristina Ciobănașu
 Vlad Gherman
 Raphael Tudor
 Carmen Brumă
 Irina Margareta Nistor

Shows 
 Dreptul la fericire ("The right to happiness"; with Florina Onețiu & Violeta Dumitrescu)
 Happy Day (with Cristina Ciobănașu, Vlad Gherman, Raphael Tudor & Carmen Brumă)

Series

External links 
 Official website for the channel

Television channels and stations established in 2005
Television stations in Romania